Bibliotheca may refer to:

 Bibliotheca (Pseudo-Apollodorus), a grand summary of traditional Greek mythology and heroic legends
 Bibliotheca historica, a first century BC work of universal history by Diodorus Siculus
 Bibliotheca (Photius), a 9th-century work of Byzantine Patriarch Photius
 Bibliotheca (Bible), a 2014 version of the Bible without chapter and verse numbers

See also
 Biblioteca Nacional (disambiguation)
 Library